Liao may refer to:

Chinese history
 Liao (Zhou dynasty state) (蓼), two states in ancient China during the Spring and Autumn period in the 8th and 7th centuries BC
 Liao of Wu (吳王僚) (died 515 BC), king of Wu during ancient China's Spring and Autumn period 
 Liao dynasty (遼朝) (916–1125), a dynasty of China ruled by the Khitan Yelü clan
 Northern Liao (北遼) (1122–1123), a regime in northern China
 Qara Khitai (西遼) (1124–1218), also called the "Western Liao", successor to the Liao dynasty in northwestern China and Central Asia
 Eastern Liao (東遼) (1213–1269), a regime in northeastern China
 Later Liao (後遼) (1216–1219), a regime in northeastern China

Other uses
 Liaoning, abbreviated as Liao (辽), a province of China 
 Liao (surname) (廖), a Chinese family name
 Liao River, a river in northeast China
 liao, a grammatical particle in Singlish
 Liao, a character of the video game Overwatch
 House Liao, the noble house in the Battletech franchise that leads the major political power called the Capellan Confederation.